Dear Dictator is a 2018 American satire comedy film written and directed by Lisa Addario and Joe Syracuse. The film stars Michael Caine, Katie Holmes, Odeya Rush, Seth Green, and Jason Biggs.

The plot follows a sixteen-year-old American girl who becomes the pen pal of a notorious island nation dictator even when he is deposed.

Plot

Tatiana Mills (Odeya Rush), a fifteen-year-old American girl, lives a quasi-chaotic life with her single mother Darlene (Katie Holmes), who is in a complex romantic relationship with her married boss Dr. Charles (Seth Green) who is a dentist with a foot fetish.  In a letter writing exercise started by her Social studies teacher Mr. Spines (Jason Biggs), Tatiana becomes pen pals with Anton Vincent (Michael Caine), a notorious island nation dictator.

When Vincent is deposed by his own people, who rise up against his violent and oppressive rule, he disappears, causing Tatiana to worry about his safety. A few days later, he unexpectedly arrives in the United States and seeks refuge in Tatiana's suburban garage. There, he develops a grandfatherly relationship with the teen and her struggling mother, becoming a useful man around the house while organizing his restoration as leader with loyalist forces back in his unnamed homeland.

Anton shifts his focus to Tatiana's high school life and her desire to deliver payback to the popular girls that bully her.  He makes her a dictator-in-training and teaches her to rise to power in her school in a similar way to his ascent to power in the Caribbean.  Ultimately his plans go too far, putting him at odds with Tatiana, who also comes under investigation from the security services who have picked up on Anton's communication with his loyalist forces and suspect she is involved with terrorism.

The police interview both Tatiana and Darlene and search their house, blissfully unaware that the old man in the house is Anton Vincent – whose whereabouts are unknown.  No evidence is found and they are released, but upon release Tatiana informs the police that the old man is Vincent and he is arrested pending extradition.

Cast

Production
The script was shown among the 2006 Black List of unproduced scripts. Also in 2006, the script was presented as a staged reading at the Nantucket Film Festival. Alfred Molina, Robert De Niro and Anthony Hopkins were previously attached as the dictator role. On June 8, 2016, Michael Caine and Maisie Williams were announced as the lead stars of the film.

Principal photography on the film began on July 29, 2016 at 402 Arlington rd. in Savannah, Georgia. First photographs of Katie Holmes and Odeya Rush filming scenes for the film were published on E! News on July 31, 2016. Production wrapped in October 2016.

Release
Dear Dictator held advance screenings, under its working title Coup d'Etat, at the Nantucket Film Festival, New Jersey Indie Street Film Festival, Carmel International Film Festival and the Napa Valley Film Festival.

Cinedigm released the film in North America simultaneously in theaters and on video on demand on March 16, 2018, followed by a DVD release on April 24, 2018. The first trailer was released on January 17, 2018.

Critical response
The film received negative reviews, but the performances of Caine and Rush were praised. The site's critical consensus reads, "Dear Dictator never comes close to taking advantage of its wildly silly premise -- or the assortment of talented veterans who round out the cast." On Metacritic, the film has a weighted average score of 44 out of 100, based on 8 critics, indicating "mixed or average reviews". The Hollywood Reporter reviewer Justin Lowe commended the film, suggesting "If only every international political crisis were this amusing."

See also
 Sarah York, American who became the pen pal of Manuel Noriega, then the de facto ruler of Panama, at age 10
 Samantha Smith 
 List of fictional dictators
 Michael Caine filmography

References

External links

 
 

2018 films
2018 comedy films
American independent films
2010s coming-of-age comedy films
American teen comedy films
American coming-of-age comedy films
American high school films
2010s political comedy films
Films shot in Georgia (U.S. state)
2010s English-language films
2010s American films